Sandow Weldemar Nasution (born March 25, 1981) is an Indonesian weightlifter.

He won gold in the 85 kg category at the 2005 Southeast Asian Games.
At the 2007 Southeast Asian Games he won gold in the 77 kg category.

He won overall silver in the 77 kg category at the 2007 Asian Championships, with a total of 328 kg.

At the 2007 World Championships he ranked 17th in the 77 kg category, with a total of 331 kg.

He competed in Weightlifting at the 2008 Summer Olympics in the 77 kg division finishing eleventh with 347 kg. This beat his previous personal best by 6 kg.

He is 5 ft 6 inches tall and weighs 170 lb.

Notes and references

External links
 NBC profile
 Athlete Biography at beijing2008

Indonesian male weightlifters
1981 births
Living people
Weightlifters at the 2008 Summer Olympics
Olympic weightlifters of Indonesia
People of Batak descent
Sportspeople from Jakarta
Southeast Asian Games gold medalists for Indonesia
Southeast Asian Games medalists in weightlifting
Competitors at the 2005 Southeast Asian Games
Competitors at the 2007 Southeast Asian Games
21st-century Indonesian people